Elkton is an unincorporated community in Hickory County, in the U.S. state of Missouri.

History
A post office called Elkton was established in 1845, and remained in operation until 1955. The community was named for the abundance of deer near the original town site.

Notable person
Hattie Helen Gould Beck (stage name Sally Rand), an early movie and stage star, was born at Elkton in 1904.

References

Unincorporated communities in Hickory County, Missouri
Unincorporated communities in Missouri